Opinion corridor refers to a sociopolitical phenomenon that has been observed during the beginning of the 21st century in Sweden, and to some extent also in Norway.

The concept is similar to the Overton window, which assumes a sliding scale of legitimate political conversation, and to Hallin's spheres, which assumes that the press implicitly groups issues into questions of wide consensus, legitimate controversy, and deviance. The Swedish Language Council has included the word åsiktskorridor in its 2014 list of neologisms.

Overview

Background 
In December 2013, political scientist  described how he perceived that the space for freedom of opinion had been tightened in Swedish debates. He provided some examples of opinions that were rarely expressed despite being common throughout the population:

 14% of Swedes agree with limiting the rights to abortion.
 40% think that Sweden should accept fewer refugees.
 60% want more animal rights.
 50% of Swedes do not agree with allowing homosexual couples to adopt children.
 20% think that there should be a death penalty for murder.
 25% of all Swedes want to increase the number of wolves.
 Almost 10% want to reduce the expenditure for wind power.
 5% agree with abolishing the graduation ceremonies in churches.

Oscarsson concluded with calling for "a more moderate and respectful attitude from policymakers".

In February 2015, Expressen editor  published an apology for being part of "constructing a corridor that prevented a constructive debate about migration and integration". She wrote that it was something that she started doing around 2002, when language tests were being debated and the Sweden Democrats started to become more influential. She was also afraid that Sweden's political climate would become more similar to that of Denmark.

Other observations 

Erik Helmersson from Dagens Nyheter wrote that Sweden has many opinion corridors in which people rarely question the norms within the group. He blames the Swedish "culture of consensus" and says the social cost for presenting an opposing view is too high. He also praises director Stina Oscarson for her new expression "test speech" and states that it's important to allow people to try new ways of thinking without being smothered by blame and insults.

Alice Teodorescu has stated that she wants to "tear down the opinion corridor" and has made comparisons with totalitarian systems.

Statistical research 

During the first quarter of 2015, the statistical institute  conducted a survey named "Who dares to speak about their opinions?" which had a sample size of 4,348. They observed the following trends:

 Increased hesitation in debates with people outside the usual social circles
 People with left-wing ideologies speak more openly while those that identify themselves as nationally oriented or conservative feel that they have more limitations
 Majorities risk being portrayed as minorities
 Immigration is the topic in which most people feel limited

Criticism and denial 

Council politician Per Altenberg from the Liberals, while not addressing the research by professor Oscarsson, denied the existence of the opinion corridor and maintained that the corridor should not be discussed in his opinion piece entitled "There is no opinion corridor".

Columnist Malin Ullgren from Dagens Nyheter, while not addressing the research by professor Oscarsson, condemns the usage of the term, and describes it as a rhetorical device the far right uses to undermine the stability of society. She states that right-wing extremists have spent years on "systematic erosion of the limits of decency" to further their agendas and that the far right freely express their agendas.

See also

References 

Politics of Sweden
Self-censorship
Freedom of expression
Political neologisms
Public opinion